TER Haute Normandie was the regional rail network serving the former region of Upper Normandy in France. In 2016 it was merged into the new TER Normandie.

Trains are operated by the SNCF, services are subject to regulation by the Conseil Régional de Haute Normandie as all TER services are and are promoted using the TER branding. The Conseil Régional has since 2001 received several new multiple units diesel-electric, including single coach, double coach and refurbishment of three car DMUs.

TER Network

Rail

Road 
Rouen – Louviers – Évreux
Évreux – Verneuil-sur-Avre
Yvetot – Saint-Valery-en-Caux
Dieppe – Serqueux – Gisors
Rouen – Pont-Audemer

See also 
SNCF
Transport express régional
Réseau Ferré de France
List of SNCF stations in Haute-Normandie
Haute-Normandie

References

External links 
 Official site

 
Transport in Normandy
Upper Normandy